A Commodore option is an exotic option consisting of a number of digital barrier options that pay a coupon if a pre-determined level of the Underlying or Basket of Underlyings is reached. Sometimes the digital barrier increases with the number of years since the trade began. All of the options are active from the start of the trade.

Example 

A three-year Commodore Option with annual barriers would have three potential payoffs. The first would pay at the end of the first year and would be dependent on the pre-determined barrier being reached or exceeded. For example, if the Underlying or Basket of Underlyings reached or exceeded 102% of its initial level at the end of year one, a coupon of 6% would be paid. At the end of year two, if the Underlying reached or exceeded 104% of its initial level, another 6% coupon would be paid. The coupon in the final year would be 6% if the Underlying reached or exceeded 106%. The coupon should exceed the performance level of the Underlying, otherwise the investor would achieve the same result by investing directly in the Underlying.

The name comes from the original Commodore option that was linked to the performance of a leading UK Stock Index. The coupons were 6% per annum and the barriers were 102% on the initial level of the index at the end of year 1 increasing by 2% per annum for years 2, 3 and 4. The investor received 3 times the performance the Stock Index, and this structure quickly gained the nickname “Commodore” after the Commodores song “Once, Twice, Three Times a Lady”

Options (finance)
Derivatives (finance)